Nataliya Ivanovna Kalashnykova is a Soviet and Mexican mathematician specializing in mathematical optimization, and especially bilevel optimization, with applications in modeling human migration and in the pricing of natural gas and toll roads. She is a professor at the Autonomous University of Nuevo León, in the Facultad de Ciencias Físico Matemáticas.

Education and career
Kalashnykova earned a master's degree in mathematical sciences from Novosibirsk State University in 1978. She completed a doctorate there in 1989, through the Siberian Division of the Academy of Sciences of the USSR. Her dissertation,  Control of Accuracy in Bi-Level Iteration Processes, was supervised by Vladimir Aleksandrovich Bulavsky. She also earned a second master's degree in economics from Sumy State University in Ukraine in 1999.

She became a faculty member at the Altai State Technical University, at the Siberian State University of Telecommunications and Informatics in Novosibirsk, and at Sumy State University, and a postdoctoral researcher at the Central Economic Mathematical Institute. She moved to her present position in Mexico at the Autonomous University of Nuevo León in 2001.

Recognition
Kalashnykova is a member of the Mexican Academy of Sciences.

Personal life
Kalashnykova is married to Vyacheslav Kalashnikov Polishchuk, another former Soviet mathematician in Mexico.

Books
Kalashnykova is a coauthor of books including:
Bilevel Programming Problems: Theory, Algorithms and Applications to Energy Networks (with Stephan Dempe, Vyacheslav Kalashnikov, and Gerardo A. Pérez-Valdés, Springer, 2015)
Public Interest and Private Enterprize : New Developments: Theoretical Results and Numerical Algorithms (with José Guadalupe Flores Muñiz, Viacheslav V. Kalashnikov, and Vladik Kreinovich, Lecture Notes in Networks and Systems 138, Springer, 2021)

References

External links

Year of birth missing (living people)
Living people
Mexican mathematicians
Mexican women mathematicians
Soviet mathematicians
Soviet women mathematicians
Novosibirsk State University alumni
Sumy State University alumni
Academic staff of Sumy State University
Academic staff of the Autonomous University of Nuevo León
Members of the Mexican Academy of Sciences